Derek Harrison (born 9 February 1950) is an English former footballer who played in the Football League as a defender for Torquay United and Colchester United. He began his career at Leicester City, where he failed to make a league appearance but played in two League Cup games. He later represented Dawlish Town and Salisbury City.

Career

Born in Littlethorpe, near Leicester, Harrison started his footballing career with Blaby Boys Club, before joining Leicester City and signing a professional contract with the club in 1967. He spent four years as a professional at Filbert Street and made his debut for the first-team in a League Cup second round replay tie on 10 September 1969, resulting in a 0–0 draw against Bristol City. He made his second and final appearance for the club in another League Cup game just over one year later on 7 October 1970, a 1–1 third round draw with Bolton Wanderers.

In search of regular first-team football, Harrison moved to Torquay United in February 1971, where he played 127 league games for the club over four years, scoring four goals.

Harrison moved on to play for Colchester United in the summer of 1975, making his debut on 16 August 1975 in a Third Division 2–1 defeat at Preston North End. He played seven league games for the U's in his short spell with the club, making his final appearance on 7 February 1976 in a 3–2 home defeat to Chesterfield.

After leaving Colchester, Harrison went on to represent Dawlish Town and Salisbury City in the English non-leagues.

References

External links
Profile at Post War English & Scottish Football League A – Z Player's Database

1950 births
Living people
People from Blaby District
Footballers from Leicestershire
English footballers
Association football defenders
Leicester City F.C. players
Torquay United F.C. players
Colchester United F.C. players
Dawlish United F.C. players
Salisbury City F.C. players
English Football League players